Pitton is a village in Wiltshire, England, about  east of Salisbury, just off the A30 London Road.

History
A Roman road (now a bridleway) forms the northern boundary of the parish and is a scheduled monument.

Local government
The civil parish of Pitton and Farley encompasses the villages of Pitton and Farley. The parish elects a parish council.  It is in the area of Wiltshire Council unitary authority, which is responsible for all significant local government functions.

Primary school 
Pitton School has been awarded International School Status in recognition of the work it has done to promote learning about other countries and their cultures as well as building partnerships with schools in such countries as Nepal. The core subjects offered at the school are English, Maths, IT, and RE, but the school also offers art, DT, geography, history, languages, music and PE.

Churches 
The Anglican Church of St Peter is Grade II* listed. It dates from the 12th century and was restored in 1878–80 by Ewan Christian. There is a window by C.E. Kempe. The church was a chapelry of Alderbury until 1874 when the parish of Farley with Pitton was established, with Farley church as the parish church. Today the parish is one of the ten covered by the Clarendon team ministry.

A Wesleyan Methodist chapel was built in 1888 and extended with a schoolroom in 1934. From 2008 to 2011 the building housed an independent school (Milford Park School) and in 2013 it was converted into two residential dwellings.

Amenities
The village has a shop and post office, a pub (The Silver Plough), a park, a village hall and a small recreation ground. This recreation field contains a tennis court, a couple of goals, and a small area with a basketball hoop.

The Clarendon Way recreational footpath between Salisbury and Winchester passes through the village.

Buses into Pitton are run by Wilts & Dorset, serving two bus stops (one by the park, one at the crossroads). The main buses are the 88 & 89 to Winterslow, although there is also an X87.

References

External links

 
 Pitton and Farley Parish Council
 Pitton and Farley community website

Villages in Wiltshire